The men's high jump at the 1978 European Athletics Championships was held in Prague, then Czechoslovakia, at Stadion Evžena Rošického on 1 and 2 September 1978.

Medalists

Results

Final
2 September

Qualification
1 September

Participation
According to an unofficial count, 26 athletes from 14 countries participated in the event.

 (3)
 (3)
 (2)
 (2)
 (1)
 (3)
 (1)
 (1)
 (1)
 (3)
 (1)
 (1)
 (2)
 (2)

References

High jump
High jump at the European Athletics Championships